Fatma Gül Güler (born 12 February 2004) is a Turkish Paralympian goalball player having visual impairment. She is a member of the national team taking part at the 2020 Summer Paralympics.

She is a high school student in Kahramanmaraş.

Honours

International
  2020 Summer Paralympics in Tokyo, Japan
  2021 IBSA Goalball European Championship in Samsun, Turkey.

References

2004 births
Living people
Sportspeople from Kahramanmaraş
Turkish blind people
Turkish sportswomen
Female goalball players
Turkish goalball players
Goalball players at the 2020 Summer Paralympics
Paralympic goalball players of Turkey
21st-century Turkish women